The 1st Texas Cavalry Regiment was a cavalry regiment from Texas that served in the Union Army during the American Civil War. Raised in Louisiana in 1862; it served in the Department of the Gulf and in Texas. It was consolidated with the 2nd Texas Cavalry Regiment in November 1864. Afterwards it continued to serve until being disbanded in November 1865.

Commanders
Col. Edmund J. Davis (promoted to Brigadier General)
Col. John L. Haynes

See also
List of Texas Civil War Union units
Nueces massacre, one of the events leading to enlistment in the Regiment

References

Units and formations of the Union Army from Texas
1862 establishments in Texas
Military units and formations established in 1862